Anders Bodelsen (11 February 1937 – 17 October 2021) was a Danish writer primarily associated with the 1960 new-realism wave in Danish literature, along with Christian Kampmann and Henrik Stangerup. Bodelsen preferred the social-realistic style of writing, often thrillers about middle-class people who face the consequences of materialism, which often clashes with their human values. His thrillers also experiment with ordinary persons tempted by e.g. theft and border-morale issues.

Most known is Bodelsen's novel Think of a Number (Tænk på et tal, 1968) filmed as The Silent Partner in 1978. Also widely known is his cooperation with Danish National Television (Danmarks Radio) on the filming of some of his children's thrillers, e.g. Guldregn ("Golden Rain", 1986).

Furthermore, he also made some lesser known radio plays.

He had a very brief cameo in the second of the Olsen-banden series of films, Olsen-banden på spanden.

Bodelsen died on 17 October 2021. He was 84 years old.

Bibliography

Novels
1959 - De lyse nætters tid
1964 - Villa Sunset
1965 - " drivhuset"
1968 - Hændeligt uheld; English translation: Hit and Run, Run, Run (1970); Grand Prix de Littérature Policière
1968 - Tænk på et tal; English translation: Think of a Number (1969)
1969 - Frysepunktet; English translation: Freezing Down (1971)
1970 - Ferie
1971 - Straus; English translation: Straus (1974)
1971 - Hjælp
1972 - Pigerne på broen
1973 - Bevisets stilling; English translation: Consider the Verdict (1976)
1974 - Alt hvad du ønsker dig
1975 - Blæsten i Alleen
1975 - Operation Cobra; English translation: Operation Cobra (1979)
1976 - Pengene og livet
1977 - De gode tider
1978 - År for år
1980 - Borte, borte
1982 - Over regnbuen
1984 - Domino
1985 - Revision
1986 - Guldregn
1988 - Mørklægning; Martin Beck Award
1989 - Byen uden ildebrande
1991 - Rød september
1993 - Farligt bryg
1997 - Den åbne dør
2009 - Varm luft

References

External links
About the author: Litteraturnet

1937 births
2021 deaths
Danish male screenwriters
Danish crime fiction writers
People from Copenhagen
20th-century Danish male writers
21st-century Danish male writers